Tatiana Rentería Rentería (born 22 December 2000) is a Colombian freestyle wrestler. She won the gold medal in the women's 76kg event at the 2022 Bolivarian Games held in Valledupar, Colombia.

Career 

She represented Colombia at the 2019 World Beach Games in Doha, Qatar and she won the gold medal in the women's 70kg beach wrestling event. In 2020, she competed at the Pan American Olympic Qualification Tournament held in Ottawa, Canada without qualifying for the 2020 Summer Olympics in Tokyo, Japan. She also failed to qualify for the Olympics at the World Olympic Qualification Tournament held in Sofia, Bulgaria.

At the 2021 U23 World Wrestling Championships held in Belgrade, Serbia, she won the silver medal in the women's 76kg event. She lost her bronze medal match at the 2022 Pan American Wrestling Championships held in Acapulco, Mexico. She competed in the 76 kg event at the 2022 World Wrestling Championships held in Belgrade, Serbia. She won her first match and she was then eliminated by Martina Kuenz of Austria.

In October 2022, she won the bronze medal in the women's 76kg event at the 2022 South American Games held in Asunción, Paraguay. In that same month, she won the gold medal in her event at the 2022 U23 World Wrestling Championships held in Pontevedra, Spain. In November 2022, she won the gold medal in her event at the Central American and Caribbean Beach Games held in Santa Marta, Colombia.

Achievements

References

External links 
 

Living people
2000 births
Place of birth missing (living people)
Colombian female sport wrestlers
South American Games bronze medalists for Colombia
South American Games medalists in wrestling
Competitors at the 2022 South American Games
21st-century Colombian women